Port Townsend Bay, also called Port Townsend, is a marine inlet off Admiralty Inlet at the northeastern extreme of the Olympic Peninsula in the U.S. state of Washington. It was named Port Townsend by George Vancouver in 1792. The name Port Townsend Bay is sometimes used to distinguish the bay from the city of Port Townsend on its northwestern shore. Another alternate name is Port Townsend Harbor.

References 

Port Townsend, Washington
Bays of Washington (state)
Bays of Jefferson County, Washington